Nannostomus britskii, (from the Greek: nanos = small, and the Latin stomus = relating to the mouth; britskii = in honor of ichthyologist, Heraldo A. Britski),commonly known as the spotstripe pencilfish, is a freshwater species of fish  belonging to the family Lebiasinidae of characins. They were first described in 1978 by Stanley H. Weitzman along with two other new species (Nannostomus limatus and Nannostomus nitidus),  from a collection of specimens preserved in the São Paulo museum.  They have been recorded from only two localities, both in Brazil. No live specimens had been seen, collected, or exported for the aquarium trade until very recently.

References

Lebiasinidae
Taxa named by Stanley Howard Weitzman
Fish described in 1978
Fish of South America
Fish of the Amazon basin